Orm Jarl was the name of five ships operated by Nordenfjeldske Dampskibsselskab.

, in service 1913–19
, lost in a collision in 1939
, in service 1947–58
, in service 1961–66
, in service 1967–69

Ship names